Bakary is a given name. Notable people with the name include:

Abubakar Khamis Bakary, Member of Parliament in the National Assembly of Tanzania
Bakary Diakité (born 1980), Malian footballer of part German descent currently playing for FSV Frankfurt
Bakary Koné (Burkinabé footballer) (born 1988), Burkinabé football (soccer) Defender, he currently plays for En Avant Guingamp
Bakary Sako (born 1988), French footballer of Malian descent who currently plays for Ligue 1 club AS Saint-Étienne
Bakary Saré (born 1990), Belgian footballer who plays in Belgium for R.S.C. Anderlecht
Bakary Soro (born 1985), Côte d'Ivoire football defender who currently plays for French Ligue 2 club Arles
Bakary Soumaré (born 1985), Malian international soccer player who plays professionally as a defender for US Boulogne in Ligue 1
Djibo Bakary (1922–1998), socialist politician and important figure in the independence movement of Niger

See also 
 Bakari (name)
 Bakare